The Church of the Assumption is a historic church at 1227 7th Ave. North in Nashville, Tennessee.

It was built in 1858 using, in part, reclaimed bricks from Nashville's first Catholic Church, Holy Rosary Cathedral. The church served the German immigrants of Nashville and was occupied by Union troops during the Civil War. It was added to the National Register of Historic Places in 1977.

Since 2016, the Church of the Assumption has celebrated the Traditional Latin Mass every Sunday, and some other days of the week, in addition to the English post-Vatican II Mass.

The Revd S Bede Price was appointed 35th Pastor of the Church of the Assumption in June 2019 and installed by The Most Revd J Mark Spalding on the Feast of the Assumption.

On March 3, 2020, the church was struck by a tornado, compromising the building's structural integrity. An extensive, multi-year restoration project subsequently began, not only to repair and reinforce the building, but to re-decorate the Church's interior. The restoration project is still ongoing in 2022.

References

Roman Catholic churches in Tennessee
Churches on the National Register of Historic Places in Tennessee
Roman Catholic churches completed in 1858
19th-century Roman Catholic church buildings in the United States
Roman Catholic churches in Nashville, Tennessee
National Register of Historic Places in Nashville, Tennessee